was a Japanese politician who was briefly Prime Minister of Japan in 1989, the first Prime Minister who came from Shiga Prefecture.  A scandal exposed by the geisha Mitsuko Nakanishi contributed to his premature resignation from office after just sixty-eight days.

Early life and education 

Uno was born in Moriyama, Shiga. His family owned a sake brewery called Arachō, and had served as town officials (toshiyori). The family had previously ran a hotel and a general store in his birth home.

In 1943, he graduated from Hikone Commercial College (later, Shiga University) where he led Hikone Commercial College to the national champion of Kendo among the commercial universities and colleges in Japan and attended the Kobe College of Commerce but had to leave the University two months later after the enrollment because he was called into the Imperial Japanese Army as an officer during World War II. After the war, he was sent to Siberia as a prisoner. He never came back to Kobe College of Commerce again.

As well as a politician, Uno was an accomplished writer, who wrote a book considered classic in Japan about his experiences as a prisoner of war in Siberia.

Political career
 
In 1960, he entered politics, winning election to the Diet of Japan. Six years later, he was promoted to Vice-Minister at the Ministry of International Trade and Industry, then similar positions with the Science and Technology Agency, then the Administrative Agency until earning his place in Cabinet as Minister for Trade and Industry and then Foreign Secretary until he was Prime Minister. Whilst Foreign Secretary (in what were conflicted times) he was applauded for his tact as foreign secretary, navigating international demands for increased Japanese contributions to international commerce with stern loyalty to his own nation's interests.

In 1974, he served briefly as Director General of the Japan Defense Agency. As the Foreign Minister under then-Prime Minister Takeshita, Uno became the first Japanese Cabinet member to visit Israel since the 1973 oil crisis. Uno's career reached a peak in the most fraught times his party had seen, as he took the reins of his party after the Recruit Scandal, when 47 Japanese MPs (including mostly other members from his own Liberal Democrat Party) were found guilty of taking bribes and unfair trading. Of all prime-ministerial candidates, only Uno was free of blame from them, and he was given charge over the party, the government, and Japan. By this stage he had served his country for almost fifty years, and was placed in office on 3 June 1989.

Geisha affair

Uno encountered public scandal in 1989, when accused by the Geisha entertainer Mitsuko Nakanishi of being "immoral" and stingy in his financial support during their four-month affair in 1986. Nakanishi would claim in following newspaper interviews that Uno had treated older geisha with arrogance and contempt, had not paid the appropriate fee of ¥300,000 per month (roughly US$21,000 at the time) for her company of four months, and had not provided a traditional parting gift (a further monetary fee) as had been custom in geisha etiquette.

A Washington Post article published in July 1989 brought international attention to the affair, with some geisha denouncing Nakanishi as a whistleblower, effectively compromising the discreet nature of the profession and engaging with political and economic affairs in the public sphere. Nakanishi later quit the profession, remarried and divorced once, attended a Shingon Buddhist school temple in Shiga Prefecture, and held various jobs unrelated to the geisha community. Due to the severity of the scandal, Nakanishi's own son disowned her during this time.

To avoid further scandal, Sōsuke Uno resigned as prime minister on 10 August 1989 after just 68 days in office, but continued to serve his country in various government posts until he retired fully in 1996. On 29 April 1994, he was awarded with the highest possible honour for a non-head-of-state, the Grand Cordon of the Order of the Rising Sun with Paulownia Flowers.

Death
At 72 years of age, Uno then enjoyed a peaceful retirement in Moriyama city. He died on 19 May 1998 in his private home. He had two daughters from
his wife. He published two collections of Haiku poems, as well as his book on prisonership in Siberia, along with painting, poetry, and music. A year later in 1999, his Geisha affair was highlighted in the Secret Life of Geisha, a TV documentary.

Honours

Grand Cordon of the Order of the Rising Sun with Paulownia Flowers -  (29 April 1994)

References

Further reading

|-

|-

|-

|-

|-

|-

|-

|-

1922 births
1998 deaths
20th-century prime ministers of Japan
Prime Ministers of Japan
Liberal Democratic Party (Japan) politicians
Foreign ministers of Japan
Japanese defense ministers
Recipients of the Order of the Rising Sun with Paulownia Flowers
Kobe University alumni
Imperial Japanese Army officers
Imperial Japanese Army personnel of World War II
Siberian internees
Politicians from Shiga Prefecture